Moraea gawleri is a species of plant in the family Iridaceae. The majority of its range lies around Western Cape province of South Africa, however it has also been recorded as far as Namaqualand to Humansdorp in the surrounding provinces.

References

External links

gawleri